Neocallotillus elegans is a species of checkered beetle in the genus Neocallotillus found in Nevada, California, New Mexico, Texas, Louisiana, Arizona, Mexico and the Central America.

References

External links

 Callotillus elegans at www.discoverlife.org
 Callotillus elegans at bugguide.net
 Neocallotillus at zookeys.pensoft.net

Tillinae
Beetles described in 1847